Râca is a commune in Argeș County, Muntenia, Romania. It is composed of three villages: Adunați, Bucov and Râca. These were part of Popești Commune until 2003, when they were split off.

References

Communes in Argeș County
Localities in Muntenia